In commodities industries, the gross processing margin (GPM) refers to the difference between the cost of a commodity and the combined sales income of the finished products that result from processing the commodity.

Various industries have formulas to express the relationship of raw material costs to sales income from finished products.

References 

Agricultural economics